Michael Aloysius Sarisky was an Ohio artist who lived from 1906 to 1974. Known for portraits and still lifes, his work was collected by the Cleveland Museum of Art. He was commissioned to provide several public works in and around Cleveland Ohio, including the City Airport and the Garfield Memorial (see reference below). He also painted a mural for the Barnesville, Ohio, Post Office 
. He was once married to Isabel Wilson. Michael and Isabel divorced, and Isabel Wilson married Roy Lichtenstein (full name Roy Fox Lichtenstein), the American pop artist.

References

External links
Michael Sarisky on artnet
Michael Sarisky on askart
Discussion board on askART with reference to Sarisky's life, education and art
President Garfield Memorial in Cleveland: 12316 Euclid Avenue (Garfield Monument at the Lake View Cemetery) The inauguration ceremony as depicted by Michael Sarisky is one of four paintings created by the Cleveland Art Institute faculty members in 1952 on the inside walls outside Memorial Hall. This scene is above the doorway which leads to the balcony
Missing post office mural done by Cleveland artist Michael Sarisky (Cathryn Stanley/Barnesville Enterprise article, March 10, 2010)

1906 births
1974 deaths
Artists from Cleveland